Igor Ośmiałowski (born 17 November 1999), known professionally as Young Igi, is a Polish rapper, trap performer and songwriter. He has collaborated with such artists as Quebonafide, Margaret, and Malik Montana. Together with Otsochodzi and Oki, he is a member of the trio OIO.

On October 19, 2018, he released his first official album Konfetti. The album reached the 6th place on the Polish sales list - OLiS.

One of his albums is certified double platinum, 3 albums gold, 1 single diamond, 2 singles double platinum, 6 singles platinum, and 15 singles gold.

Discography

Studio albums 

 Konfetti (2018), POL: gold
 Skan myśli (2019), POL: gold
 Notatki z marginesu (2022)

Mixtapes 

 Trappist (2017)
 !G! Tape #1 (2019)

Collaborative albums 

 OIO (with Otsochodzi and Oki as OIO) (2021), POL: 2× platinum
 Amfisbena (with Żabson) (2022), POL: gold

References 

Polish rappers
1999 births
Living people